Sangtuda 2 Hydroelectric Power Plant is a Tajik hydroelectric power plant on the Vakhsh River.

History
Construction commenced during the Soviet period in the 1980s, but halted in the beginning of the 1990s due to lack of financing. In 1995, Iran expressed interest in helping to finish the project, but an agreement was not signed until 2005. Building work restarted on 20 December 2006.

The first unit was inaugurated on 6 September 2011 by presidents Emomalii Rahmon and Mahmoud Ahmadinejad.

Description
The power plant is built and operated Iranian company Sangob.  The turnkey contractor was Farab International Co. The project was consulted by Mahab Ghods Engineering Company and the subcontractor was Omran Maroon Engineers Company.  It operates simultaneously with Sangtuda 1 Hydroelectric Power Plant.  It uses gates of Nurek reservoir.

The dam is an earth fill dam with clay core.

The run-of-river type power plant consist of two units able to produce 1 TWh of electricity a year. The generating equipment is manufactured in China.

Revenues during first 12 years would be paid to Iran – and after that, ownership would be transferred to Tajikistan.

References

Hydroelectric power stations in Tajikistan
Dams in Tajikistan
Dams completed in 2011
Dams on the Vakhsh River
Earth-filled dams
Energy infrastructure completed in 2011
Khatlon Region
2011 establishments in Tajikistan
Iran–Tajikistan relations